23rd Army may refer to:

 23rd Army (People's Republic of China)
23rd Army (Soviet Union)
Twenty-Third Army (Japan), a unit during World War II